Parelbella is a Neotropical genus of firetips in the family Hesperiidae.

Species
Parelbella polyzona (Latreille, [1824]) polyzona skipper - southeast Brazil 
Parelbella ahira (Hewitson, 1866) Ahira skipper - type locality Brazil 
Parelbella ahira ahira (Hewitson, 1866) French Guiana, Colombia, Peru, Bolivia, Paraguay, north and west Brazil
Parelbella ahira extrema (Röber, 1925) southeast Brazil, Paraguay
Parelbella peruana O. Mielke, 1995 Peruana skipper - Peru
Parelbella macleannani (Godman & Salvin, 1893) Macleannan's skipper - southeast Mexico to northwest Ecuador
Parelbella nigra O. Mielke, Austin & A. Warren, 2008 Mielke's skipper southeast Mexico

References
Parelbella - Natural History Museum Lepidoptera genus database

Hesperiidae
Hesperiidae of South America
Hesperiidae genera